Clockwatchers is a 1997 American comedy-drama film directed by Jill Sprecher. It stars Toni Collette, Parker Posey, Lisa Kudrow, and Alanna Ubach as temporary office staffers in an office complex. 
The four become misfit friends in an office environment where they are ignored and mistrusted by their co-workers.

Plot
Iris is a timid young woman who begins a new office job at a credit company where she temps. She soon meets Margaret who is as assertive as Iris is meek; the two women become friends as Margaret teaches Iris the many ways to deal with the sorrowful world of being a temp. She introduces Iris to two other temps: aspiring actress Paula eagerly awaits post-work happy hours and the chance to flirt with attractive men, and naive Jane is engaged to marry a jerk who makes up for his rude behavior by buying her gifts. Margaret is upset when a strange woman named Cleo arrives at the company and is hired as a permanent employee after her first day. Margaret hopes to become an executive assistant to stressed out manager Mr. Lasky, but her dreams are thwarted when he dies of a heart attack. The four temps forge a sort of camaraderie based on being outsiders at the company.

A series of thefts occur in the office and suspicion falls on the temps, particularly Margaret. Margaret believes that Cleo is at fault but the other temps suspect Margaret may be stealing things herself. Iris's plastic toy monkey goes missing and when she sees it inside of Margaret's desk, Iris loses faith in Margaret. While walking one day, Margaret and Iris see Jane's fiance with another girl, but do not do anything about it. At Jane's bridal shower, the girls confide in Paula, who lashes out at Margaret by saying that she doesn't understand how much marriage means to people.

As the office stealing continues, the girls are put under more and more stress which strains their friendship, as all their shoddy desks are put into a fishbowl-type area and they are spied on and searched by the office security guards. Iris discovers Paula vomiting in the bathroom on their lunch break, Paula then tells Iris she thinks she may be pregnant, but soon after tells her it was a false alarm. Margaret explains to Iris that Paula typically lies about booking acting roles in order to make herself seem better.

Eventually, Margaret suggests a one-day strike from work due to mistreatment and being underappreciated as temps, and her friends halfheartedly agree to join her, but on the appointed day, Margaret is the only one who does not come to work. As a result, Barbara, the company's unlikable and unkind head of human resources fires Margaret. Margaret calls out for support, but none of her friends or coworkers say anything as she is removed from the building. Iris finds out that Margaret had simply had a similar plastic monkey in her desk and she was not the thief after all. She expresses her regret at not speaking up when Margaret was fired. The friendships between the temps dissolves, as Iris relates that she didn't attend Jane's wedding, and also that Paula was transferred to accounting. In a sad moment when she moves to another desolate temp desk, Iris throws a picture she took during a night out with Margaret, Paula, and Jane into the trash.

When Iris spots Cleo stealing a few items from a senior executive's desk, she follows her home and is surprised to see Cleo lives in a mansion. She angrily leaves Cleo a note at work demanding her stolen notebook back, and when Cleo fishes it out of her purse and hands it to her, Iris is not forgiving: she later burns the notebook (which Cleo had drawn inside) in front of Cleo at lunch. Cleo later leaves a fancy new notebook on Iris' desk with two words written inside its first page: "I'm Sorry."

When Iris is not hired for a permanent job she'd applied for at another company- a position she really wanted - she quits. A pleasant but distant senior executive agrees to sign a pre-written letter of recommendation for her (but under Margaret's name). Fulfilling Margaret's previously stated resolution to get a recommendation out of her bleak time as a temp, Iris then mails the letter of recommendation to Margaret with a note, and resolves that she will no longer be the passive person she was when the story began.

Cast

Release
The film was first released on June 12, 1997, in Australia, the native country of Toni Collette. In the United States, it was released nearly a year later on May 15, 1998.

Reception
Clockwatchers received generally positive reviews from critics. It holds an 85% approval rating at Rotten Tomatoes based on 26 reviews. 

In a positive review, Roger Ebert wrote that Clockwatchers is "a rare film about the way people actually live", "the kind of movie that can change lives", and awarded it three-and-a-half out of four stars.

In a negative review, Owen Gleiberman called the film "as empty of drive and imagination as its poor-little-victim heroines, who never seem more than sulky, overgrown high school girls".

References

External links
 
 
 

1997 films
1997 comedy-drama films
1997 directorial debut films
1997 independent films
1990s American films
1990s buddy comedy-drama films
1990s business films
1990s English-language films
1990s female buddy films
American buddy comedy-drama films
American business films
American female buddy films
American independent films
Films directed by Jill Sprecher
Films set in offices
Goldcrest Films films
Workplace comedy films